Acutosternus is a genus of beetles in the family Carabidae, containing the following species:

 Acutosternus mandibularis Lecordier & Girard, 1988
 Acutosternus ovatulus (Fairmaire, 1899)

References

Licininae